Payneville is a rural community in Meade County, Kentucky, United States.  It is a small community of 1300 residents that lies 7.5 miles west of Brandenburg on KY 144 at its intersection with KY 376.

Located near here are the Payneville Petroglyphs, listed in the National Register of Historic Places.

References

Unincorporated communities in Meade County, Kentucky
Louisville metropolitan area
Unincorporated communities in Kentucky